Too Many Coincidences is a 2016 Azerbaijani drama film directed by Ulviyya Konul.

Synopsis
The main characters – Mike Kovalski, a young American of Azerbaijani descent and a young business woman Aydan Bagirzade face a number of similar situations. They meet by accident and their meeting is full of surprises.

Cast
 Tural Asadov as Michael Kovalski
 Aydan Akhundzadeh as Aydan Bagirzadeh
 Evgeniya Orudzheva as Jane
 Kamran Aghabalayev as Ajdar
 Afag Bashirgyzy as Fatma Hala

References

External links
 

2016 films
2016 romantic comedy films
Azerbaijani romantic comedy films
Azerbaijani-language films
Azerbaijanfilm films